John William Hurrell Watts  was born in Teignmouth, England on September 16, 1850.  He emigrated to Canada in 1873. He was the first curator of the Royal Canadian Academy of Arts' National Gallery. As an architect, he also designed Fleck/Paterson House, St Augustine's and Booth House. He was a founding member of the Ontario Association of Architects. He died in Ottawa on August 26, 1917.

Four small etchings by Watts were featured in the first Royal Canadian Academy of Arts (RCA) exhibition in March 1880. He was part of the Etching Revival Movement, which was virtually unknown in Canada, and was perhaps the first practising etcher to display his work in Canada. He taught the technique to artists William Brymner and Ernest Fosbery.

References

External links 
 John William Hurrell Watts fonds at the National Gallery of Canada, Ottawa, Ontario

1850 births
1917 deaths
People from Teignmouth
Members of the Royal Canadian Academy of Arts